Walker is a city in Linn County, Iowa. The population was 688 at the 2020 census. It is part of the Cedar Rapids, Iowa metropolitan area.

History
Walker began as an outgrowth of the Burlington, Cedar Rapids and Northern Railway. It was named in honor of W. W. Walker, chief engineer of the railroad.

Geography

Demographics

2010 census
As of the census of 2010, there were 791 people, 289 households, and 215 families living in the city. The racial makeup of the city was 98.0% White, 0.3% African American, 0.4% Native American, 0.1% from other races, and 1.3% from two or more races. Hispanic or Latino of any race were 1.0% of the population.

There were 289 households, of which 41.5% had children under the age of 18 living with them, 59.9% were married couples living together, 9.7% had a female householder with no husband present, 4.8% had a male householder with no wife present, and 25.6% were non-families. 21.1% of all households were made up of individuals, and 12.5% had someone living alone who was 65 years of age or older. The average household size was 2.74 and the average family size was 3.18.

The median age in the city was 34 years. 32.2% of residents were under the age of 18; 6.4% were between the ages of 18 and 24; 26.5% were from 25 to 44; 22.4% were from 45 to 64; and 12.6% were 65 years of age or older. The gender makeup of the city was 48.5% male and 51.5% female.

2000 census
As of the census of 2000, there were 750 people, 273 households, and 197 families living in the city. The racial makeup of the city was 98.67% White, 0.27% African American, 0.53% Native American, and 0.53% from two or more races.

There were 273 households, out of which 40.3% had children under the age of 18 living with them, 62.6% were married couples living together, 7.3% had a female householder with no husband present, and 27.5% were non-families. 22.7% of all households were made up of individuals, and 13.2% had someone living alone who was 65 years of age or older. The average household size was 2.75 and the average family size was 3.23.

30.7% were under the age of 18, 8.5% from 18 to 24, 30.3% from 25 to 44, 18.7% from 45 to 64, and 11.9% were 65 years of age or older. The median age was 33 years. For every 100 females, there were 94.3 males. For every 100 females age 18 and over, there were 86.4 males.

The median income for a household in the city was $43,438, and the median income for a family was $50,556. Males had a median income of $34,271 versus $23,618 for females. The per capita income for the city was $16,258. About 4.1% of families and 5.2% of the population were below the poverty line, including 6.6% of those under age 18 and 8.5% of those age 65 or over.

Education
The North Linn Community School District operates area public schools. Just north of Walker was Cono Christian School, an international boarding school, founded by Max Belz in 1948, now used as a summer camp and retreat center.

Notable people 
 Clifton Brady, Seattle-based architect 
 Luella Klein, obstetrician-gynecologist
 Joel Belz, journalist, publisher

References

Cities in Linn County, Iowa
Cities in Iowa
Cedar Rapids, Iowa metropolitan area